This is a list of courthouses in the United States.  American courthouses are very often significant, as they are public buildings usually built to convey solidity and to command respect.  Many have hosted important trials, or are significant for their architecture, and thus many have been designated as historic sites.

This list includes state, county, city, town and other municipalities' courthouses, as well as subsuming U.S. Federal courthouses (which are also listed at List of United States federal courthouses).  There are no known courthouses of international scope located in the U.S.

County courthouses

There exist current or former county courthouses corresponding to the county seats (or shire towns) of most of the United States' 3,144 counties or county-equivalents, and also to a number of former counties.

Variations on county seats include:
Currently 36 U.S. counties have dual county seats
Louisiana has parishes and parish seats rather than counties and county seats; this list includes its notable parish courthouses.
Connecticut no longer has county governments; this list includes its historic county courthouses and also the state's currently functioning courthouses serving 20 geographical areas that do not correspond to the former counties.
Massachusetts
Alaska has boroughs and borough-equivalents, and borough seats.  It has 39 trial court locations and has appellate courts in Anchorage and Fairbanks.
Some counties have branch courthouses, including Pinellas County, Florida (county seat Clearwater, branch in St. Petersburg) and Marion County, Missouri (county seat Palmyra for District 1, Hannibal for District 2).

Alabama

Federal courthouses in Alabama are listed here.

County courthouses in Alabama are listed here.

Alaska

Federal courthouses in Alaska are listed here.

Alaska has boroughs and non-borough census areas.  Its equivalent to a county seat is a borough seat.  It has 39 trial court locations and appellate courts in at least Fairbanks and Anchorage.

Selected non-Federal courthouses in Alaska include:

Rabinowitz Courthouse, 101 Lacey St., Fairbanks, is an Alaska state's Alaska Court of Appeals courthouse and a trial courthouse.
Chevak Courthouse, 136 Lakeside Rd., Chevak, also serves Fairbanks-North Star
Nesbett Courthouse, 825 W. 4th St., Anchorage
Boney Courthouse, 303 K St., Anchorage
Sitka Courthouse, 304 Lake Street, Sitka
Valdez Courthouse, 213 Meals Ave., Valdez

Arizona
Federal courthouses in Arizona are listed here.

Notable current and former county courthouses include:

Arkansas
Federal courthouses in Arkansas are listed here.

County courthouses in Arkansas are listed here.

California
Federal courthouses in California are listed here.

County courthouses include:

Colorado
Federal courthouses in Colorado are listed here.

County courthouses include:

Connecticut
Federal courthouses in Connecticut are listed here.

County courthouses include:

Delaware
Federal courthouses in Delaware are listed here.

County courthouses include:

District of Columbia

Florida
Federal courthouses in Florida are listed here.

County and any other courthouses include:

Georgia
Federal courthouses in Georgia are listed here

County courthouses in Georgia are listed here.

Hawaii
Federal courthouses in Hawaii are listed here.

Idaho
Federal courthouses in Idaho are listed here.

County and any other non-Federal courthouses include:

Illinois
Federal courthouses in Illinois are listed here.

For current county courthouses, including some that are historic, see List of county courthouses in Illinois#Current.  For former county courthouses that are notable, see List of county courthouses in Illinois#Former.

Indiana
Federal courthouses in Indiana are listed here.

County and any other courthouses include:

Iowa
Federal courthouses in Iowa are listed here.

County courthouses in Iowa are listed here.

Kansas
Federal courthouses in Kansas are listed here.

County courthouses in Kansas are listed here.

Kentucky
Federal courthouses in Kentucky are listed here.

However, the Old U.S. Customshouse and Post Office and Fireproof Storage Company Warehouse, in Louisville, Kentucky, also served as a Federal district courthouse.

The "Old Courthouse", or "Greensburg Courthouse" in Greensburg, Kentucky, built during 1802-04, is the oldest courthouse west of the Alleghenies.  Future Kentucky governor Thomas Metcalfe was one of the builders.  It is included in the Downtown Greensburg Historic District.

County courthouses include:

Louisiana
Federal courthouses in Louisiana are listed here.

Parish and other courthouses include:

Maine
Federal courthouses in Maine are listed here.

Maine's Superior Court holds court in each of Maine's 16 counties, and Aroostook County has two Superior Courts.

District court operates at many locations.

County courthouses and any other courthouses include:

Maryland
Federal courthouses in Maryland are listed here.

County and other courthouses include:

Massachusetts
Federal courthouses in Massachusetts are listed here.

Courthouses in Boston are listed here.

County and other courthouses include:

Michigan
Federal courthouses in Michigan are listed here.

County and other courthouses include:

Minnesota
Federal courthouses in Minnesota are listed here.

County courthouses in Minnesota are listed here.

Mississippi
Federal courthouses in Mississippi are listed here.

Historically Mississippi may have had a county court in each of its 82 counties but in 2016, Mississippi has just 19 county courts.  There are in fact at least five distinct types of non-Federal courts in Mississippi:
County courts are created by the state legislature to reduce the workload of circuit courts and chancery courts.  Adams County Court, for example, has one County Court judge, and has "exclusive jurisdiction over matters involving eminent domain, unlawful entry and detainer, youth courts and partition of personal property."  It also "shares jurisdiction with Justice Court in all matters, civil and criminal [and it] also shares jurisdiction with the Circuit and Chancery Courts in all matters of law and equity up to $200,000. The County Court Judge also hears non-capital felony criminal cases transferred by the Circuit Court."
Circuit courts have "original jurisdiction over all civil and criminal matters not vested exclusively in another court", and most circuit court cases are handled by juries.
Chancery courts cover "domestic/family matters, divorce, child custody, property division, adoptions, alimony, estates of descendants, land issues (titles, contracts), emancipation (declaring a minor to be 21 for work purposes), property title confirmation, property disputes (over $50,000), insurance settlements to minors, and commitments of mentally disabled."
Justice courts covers traffic tickets, civil cases including small claims and felony cases through initial appearances and preliminary hearings.
Youth court covers "matters involving delinquent children, children in need of supervision, and neglected and/or abused children."

County and other non-Federal courthouses, historical and current, include:

Missouri
Federal courthouses in Missouri are listed here.

County courthouses in Missouri are listed here.

Montana
Federal courthouses in Montana are listed here.

County and other courthouses include:

Nebraska
Federal courthouses in Nebraska are listed here.

County and other courthouses in Nebraska are listed here.

Nevada
Federal courthouses in Nevada are listed here.

County and other courthouses include:

New Hampshire
Federal courthouses in New Hampshire are listed here.

County and other courthouses include:

New Jersey
Federal courthouses in New Jersey are listed here

County courthouses in New Jersey are listed here

For state courthouse see Richard J. Hughes Justice Complex.

New Mexico
Federal courthouses in New Mexico are listed here.

County courthouses in New Mexico are listed here.

New York
Federal courthouses in New York are listed here.

State and county courthouses include:

North Carolina
Federal courthouses in North Carolina are listed here.

County courthouses in North Carolina are listed here.

North Dakota
Federal courthouses in North Dakota are listed here.

County and other courthouses include:

Ohio
Federal courthouses in Ohio are listed here.

County and other courthouses include:

Oklahoma
Federal courthouses in Oklahoma are listed here.

County and other courthouses include:

Oregon
Federal courthouses in Oregon are listed here.

County and other courthouses include:

Pennsylvania

Federal courthouses in Pennsylvania are listed here.

State and County courthouses in Pennsylvania are listed here.

Rhode Island
Federal courthouses in Rhode Island are listed here.

County courthouses include:

Also from category, to check:
Old State House (Providence, Rhode Island)

South Carolina
Federal courthouses in South Carolina are listed here.

County courthouses in South Carolina are listed here.

South Dakota
Federal courthouses in South Dakota are listed here.

County and other courthouses include:

Tennessee
Federal courthouses in Tennessee are listed here

County and other courthouses include:

Texas
Federal courthouses in Texas are listed here.

County courthouses in Texas are partially listed here.

Utah
Federal courthouses in Utah are listed here.

County and other courthouses include:

Vermont
Federal courthouses in Vermont are listed here.

County and other courthouses include:

Virginia
Federal courthouses in Virginia are listed here.

County and other courthouses include:

Washington
Federal courthouses in the state of Washington are listed here.

County courthouses in Washington are listed here.

West Virginia
Federal courthouses in West Virginia are listed here.

County and other courthouses include:

Wisconsin
Federal courthouses in Wisconsin are listed here.

County and any other courthouses include:

Wyoming
Federal courthouses in Wyoming are listed here.

County and other courthouses include:

United States territories
Federal courthouses in United States territories are listed here.

Other courthouses include:

See also
 List of courthouses (worldwide)
 List of United States federal courthouses
 List of the oldest courthouses in the United States

References